Siobhan Hewlett is a British-born Irish film, television, radio and theatre actress as well as being a producer, poet and artist. She hails from a theatrical dynasty stretching back to the 19th-century.

Background and early life 
Her great-grandparents "Loch & Lomond" were variety and vaudeville performers, as were her grandparents who met whilst performing for the judges and diplomats at the Nuremberg War Trials (introduced by their mutual agent and her godfather, Sir Lew Grade). Siobhan's grandmother was the last remaining captain of the Bluebell girls, the high-kicking can can troupe who danced her way from Ireland around Europe and South America in the 1920s and 1930s, working with Mistinguett, Josephine Baker, Maurice Chevalier, and Jacques Tati.
 
Her grandfather, was a slapstick comic whose act involved multiple back flips off walls. Her great aunts, sisters Karina and Eve, were contortionists. Siobhan's father, Donald Hewlett, was an actor best known for It Ain't Half Hot Mum. Her mother, Thérèse McMurray, was a child star and lead in the hospital-based drama Emergency Ward 10.

Educated in England, Hewlett attended Wellesley House School, Downe House School, and The King's School, Canterbury on art scholarships. A period of family ill health during Siobhán's childhood meant that she became her family's main carer. 

At The King's School, Canterbury she was spotted in a production by the theatrical agent Hamilton Hodell, turned down a place at Cambridge to read English and subsequently won a scholarship to study acting at the prestigious Webber Douglas Academy of Dramatic Art in London for their 3-year classical acting diploma course.

Career 

Whilst still at drama school at 19, Hewlett was chosen by French film director Antoine de Caunes to play the leading role in Monsieur N, a role that required she learn French. Shortly afterward, she starred in the British comedy series Fortysomething, opposite Hugh Laurie and Benedict Cumberbatch, for ITV.  

Hewlett made her professional stage debut at The Finborough Theatre in London, starring opposite Chris O'Dowd, Clarke Peters, and Daniela Nardini in Etta Jenks. She found further success in BBC BAFTA winning The Canterbury Tales opposite Dame Julie Walters and Bill Nighy, and The Virgin Queen opposite Tom Hardy and Anne Marie Duff.

To great acclaim, Hewlett made her West end stage debut at the Donmar Warehouse in Christopher Hampton's hit play The Philanthropist, starring opposite Simon Russell Beale, Simon Day and Danny Webb. Hewlett and Beale won the South Bank show award for comedy.

Subsequently, she continued in film and TV roles including indie hit Irina Palm, opposite Marianne Faithfull and Kevin Bishop which won the audience prize at The Berlin international Film Festival. Hewlett continued working with Cumberbatch when she guest starred in the first episode of award-winning Sherlock and hit series Parades End.

Hewlett featured in Vogue 100 list in 2005 as one of the UK stars of tomorrow and in 2006 was photographed by Rankin for Vanity Fair as part of their rising stars collection, as well as being named by ID magazine as Jean Paul Gautier and Jenny Packham's muse.

As her cancer-stricken widowed mother's health stabilised, Hewlett spent some time in Los Angeles, attending Groundlings Improv school as well as performing with LA Theatre works opposite Jared Harris, Susan Sullivan, Martin Jarvis and Rosalind Ayres. During this period, Hewlett started working with legendary comic book writer Alan Moore (Watchmen, V for Vendetta) and photographer/director Mitch Jenkins. Hewlett starred as journalist Faith Harrington in a series of occult noir films - the first of which, was 'Act of Faith'. Hewlett became exec producer on the series, 'Showpieces' and subsequent feature, The Show starring opposite Tom Burke as Fletcher Dennis. The Show was to premiere at SXSW 2020.

Hewlett studied playwriting at the Royal Court Theatre's prestigious Young Writers program under playwright Simon Stephens. In 2020, Hewlett began collaborating with Neil Gaiman adapting one of his short stories into a feature film. Hewlett has a production company with her brother, Patrick Hewlett, as well as her own company Oyster Films.

Theatre

Hewlett's theatre credits include Kitty in Etta Jenks and the Finborough Theatre with Chris O'Dowd, Daniela Nardini and Clarke Peters, directed by Che Walker;  Ginny in Relatively Speaking with Peter Bowles; The Waltz of the Toreadors at Chichester Festival Theatre directed by Angus Jackson; and Donny's Brain by Rona Munro at Hampstead Theatre opposite Ryan Early.

Additional works

Hewlett is a singer, published artist and poet. Her first exhibition was at The Osborne Studio Gallery, Belgravia, London in 2008.

Hewlett studied writing at The Royal Court Theatre's prestigious Young Writers program under playwright Simon Stephens.

Hewlett has adapted, is producing and starring in a feature-length adaptation of short story, The Thing About Cassandra by Neil Gaiman.

Hewlett, alongside old family friend Benedict Cumberbatch was chosen to represent The Royal Marsden Cancer Charity as one of their ambassadors in 2017.

Hewlett, was a founder member with friend Tom Hardy of their theatre group ShotGun.

Filmography

Film

Television

Theatre

Video Games

References

External links 

Hewlett's page at her agent's website
Interview with Siobhan Hewlett by 4 Guys with Quarters

Living people
Actresses from London
Alumni of the Webber Douglas Academy of Dramatic Art
English film actresses
English television actresses
Year of birth missing (living people)